Kenneth MacDonald  (20 November 1950 – 6 August 2001) was an English actor who was best known for the parts of Gunner Nobby Clark in It Ain't Half Hot Mum and Mike Fisher in Only Fools and Horses.

Personal life
MacDonald was born in Manchester, the son of Scottish heavyweight wrestling champion Bill MacDonald, who died of kidney failure at the age of 43 when Kenneth was 13.

He attended Xaverian College preparatory school in Fallowfield, Manchester, St Anthony's preparatory school in Stony Stratford, Buckinghamshire, and went on to St Bernardine's Franciscan College in Buckingham, where he took part in school productions, notably The Business of Good Government, in which he played Herod, and Arsenic and Old Lace. Ken left school at eighteen to help support his mother Emily. He took a job at a Kellogg's cornflakes factory. During night shifts he would perform Hamlet and other Shakespeare plays that he had learned at school, earning the nickname "Hamlet". MacDonald met his wife Sheila while he was appearing in panto in Crewe in 1976. She was the costume designer at the time. They had two children: William (born 1986) and Charlotte (born 1989).

Acting career
MacDonald's first television role was Benny in Softly, Softly in 1972. In 1975, he made a guest appearance in series 2, episode 1, of Last of the Summer Wine. A year later he moved to London and joined the National Youth Theatre. He appeared in a 1977 episode of Dad's Army.
 
MacDonald featured regularly in the BBC sitcom It Ain't Half Hot Mum, running from 3 January 1974 to 3 September 1981. It was set in the jungles of Burma and India during the Second World War and MacDonald played the character Gunner "Nobby" Clark, a member of a Royal Artillery Concert Party.

He also had a minor part as Jacko's brother in the comedy series Brush Strokes which ran from 1986 to 1991, in which he was married to the less than faithful Gloria.

When he landed the part of pub landlord Mike in the Only Fools and Horses episode "Who's a Pretty Boy?" in 1983, it was initially believed to be a one-episode role. However, the character became a series regular, appearing until Christmas 1996.

MacDonald also appeared in the Granada Television Rentals television adverts of the late 1970s and made a cameo appearance in one episode of Goodnight Sweetheart, playing Mr Jones alongside his Only Fools and Horses co-star Nicholas Lyndhurst. He also appeared in an episode of The Thin Blue Line as a club owner. In 1996 he played DI McCluskey in Crocodile Shoes II alongside Jimmy Nail. In 1992, MacDonald had a brief appearance on the Channel 4 soap Brookside as George Webb, a racist owner of a petrol station.

His character Mike in Only Fools and Horses was not killed off. When the programme was revived for three episodes from 2001, after MacDonald's death, Mike was imprisoned for trying to embezzle the brewery.

Death
MacDonald died suddenly on 6 August 2001 at the age of 50 after suffering a massive heart attack while on holiday with his family in Hawaii. Seven days after his death, MacDonald's guest appearance on BBC television drama Merseybeat was aired, with the episode dedicated to his memory. He was buried on 16 August 2001 at Teddington Cemetery in Teddington in the London Borough of Richmond upon Thames.

Filmography

References

External links
 

1950 births
2001 deaths
20th-century English male actors
British male comedy actors
Burials at Teddington Cemetery
English male television actors
Male actors from Manchester
National Youth Theatre members